The Point of View is a 1920 American silent drama film directed by Alan Crosland and starring Elaine Hammerstein, Rockliffe Fellowes, and Arthur Housman.

Cast
 Elaine Hammerstein as Marjory Thorncroft 
 Rockliffe Fellowes as David Lawrence 
 Arthur Housman as Dallas Henley 
 Hugh Huntley as Lawrence Thorncroft 
 Helen Lindroth as Aunt Caroline 
 Cornish Beck as Maitland Thorncroft 
 Warren Cook as Thorncroft, Sr.

Preservation
With no listings for The Point of View in any film archive, it is a lost film.

References

Bibliography
 Monaco, James. The Encyclopedia of Film. Perigee Books, 1991.

External links

1920 films
1920 drama films
Silent American drama films
Films directed by Alan Crosland
American silent feature films
1920 lost films
American black-and-white films
Selznick Pictures films
Lost drama films
1920s American films